Trine Dyveke Sternberg Tviberg (born 6 December 1969) is a former Norwegian football player who played for the Norway women's national football team.

She played on the Norwegian team that won silver medals at the 1991 FIFA Women's World Cup in China.

References

1969 births
Living people
Norwegian women's footballers
Norway women's international footballers
Toppserien players
SK Brann Kvinner players
1991 FIFA Women's World Cup players
UEFA Women's Championship-winning players

Women's association footballers not categorized by position